IEEE Transactions on Robotics is a bimonthly peer-reviewed scientific journal published by the Institute of Electrical and Electronics Engineers (IEEE). It covers all aspects of robotics and is sponsored by the IEEE Robotics and Automation Society. The editor-in-chief is Kevin Lynch (Northwestern University)..

Publication History
The journal was established in 1985 as the IEEE Journal on Robotics and Automation, but changed name in 1989 to IEEE Transactions on Robotics and Automation. In 2004 the journal split into IEEE Transactions on Automation Science and Engineering and IEEE Transactions on Robotics.

Abstracting and indexing 
The journal is abstracted and indexed in:
Science Citation Index Expanded
Scopus

According to the Journal Citation Reports, the journal has a 2021 impact factor of 6.835, ranking it 7th out of 30 journals in the category "Robotics"

References

External links

Robotics journals
IEEE academic journals
Publications established in 1985
Bimonthly journals
English-language journals